A Girl of Yesterday is a 1915 American silent comedy film directed by Allan Dwan, and distributed by Paramount Pictures and Famous Players-Lasky. The film starred Mary Pickford (who also wrote the scenario) as an older woman. Before this film, Pickford was mainly cast in "little girl" roles which were popular with the public.  A Girl of Yesterday costarred Pickford's younger brother Jack, Marshall Neilan, Donald Crisp and Frances Marion, who later became a prolific screenwriter. Real life aviation pioneer Glenn L. Martin also made a cameo in the film.

Plot
Jane Stuart (Mary Pickford), a sweet old-fashioned girl brought up with her brother John (Jack Pickford), by their poor Aunt Angela (Gertrude Norman), suddenly inherits wealth. While she tries to retain her traditional wardrobe, customs and ways, her brother likes the attention that is now being paid to them by people like their neighbours, the Monroes (Donald Crisp), (Lillian Langdon), who previously shunned them.

Rosanna Danford (Frances Marion), is “the wicked sophisticate” who has her eye on Stanley Hudson (Marshall Neilan), Mary's beau. At her first reception, Jane, now wealthy, is still wearing her grandmother's old-fashioned gown. She, however, is dressed more demurely compared to the other girls at the event and attracts a group of male admirers.

Jane later tries to fit in with a new crowd, and attempts tennis and golf. She accepts an invitation to go yachting from Stanley, who, hoping to win Jane, has attempted to introduce her to a new luxurious life. Rosanna is jealous and arranges for a pilot to take Jane flying, planning that she will miss the outing and be far away from Stanley. Jane is "kidnapped" and taken away by an aircraft.

Although a misunderstanding follows, Jane later accepts Stanley's belated proposal.

Cast

 Mary Pickford as Jane Stuart
 Jack Pickford as John Stuart
 Gertrude Norman as Aunt Angela
 Donald Crisp as A.H. Monroe
 Marshall Neilan as Stanley Hudson
 Frances Marion as Rosanna Danford
 Lillian Langdon as Mrs. A.H. Monroe
 Claire Alexander as Eloise Monroe
 Glenn L. Martin as Pilot

Production
The flying scene in A Girl of Yesterday where Mary Pickford is taken away by an aircraft, was filmed in Griffith Park, Los Angeles, California. When Mary and Jack Pickford, appeared in roles as brother and sister in this film, it was the first time actual brother and sister were cast.

A Girl of Yesterday was notable for the screen debut of famous pioneering aviator Glenn Martin. He flew a Martin TT biplane, one of his own designs at Griffith Park, where he operated a flying school. In 1912, Martin built an airplane factory in Los Angeles. To finance this business, he began stunt-flying at fairs and local airfields. In 1915, Martin saw an advertisement for a pilot/aircraft owner to play a role in a film. Sensing an opportunity, he replied to the ad and got the part. Martin would play the role of a dashing hero in A Girl of Yesterday starring Mary Pickford. 

The multimillion-dollar yacht that Mary Pickford and Marshall Neilan use on a date, belonged to "Sugar King" John D. Spreckels of San Francisco.

Reception
Resident Scholar Cari Beauchamp in writing at the "Mary Pickford Foundation", described the loss of A Girl of Yesterday as particularly poignant. "...one of her “lost” films – 'A Girl of Yesterday' from 1915 – that is particularly missed because there were so many things about it that made it special." The film brought together many old friends. "Mickey Neilan, a friend of Jack Pickford’s who had been working in films for several years, but wanted to direct. (Many filmographies credit Mary with writing the story, but in his memoirs, Mickey Neilan claims that Frances [Marion] wrote it)." Further, "All those close inner connections simmering in the cast and crew could have wreaked havoc, but everyone involved seemed to enjoy each other and [Allan] Dwan was secure enough in his own abilities to include others in the creative process."

The beautiful locales such as Santa Catalina Island were also featured in A Girl of Yesterday. "In part it is the thought of seeing all these locations circa 1915 that makes the loss of 'A Girl of Yesterday' such a heartbreak for film fans. Of course it would also be great fun to see Jack Pickford, Mary Pickford, Mickey Neilan and Frances Marion all together on the screen, knowing as we do that Mary, Mickey and Frances would work together often in the years ahead and be lifelong friends."

Preservation status
The film is now presumed to be a lost film.

See also
List of lost films

References

Notes

Citations

Bibliography

 Beauchamp, Cari. Without Lying Down: Frances Marion and the Powerful Women of Early Hollywood. Berkeley, California: University of California Press, 1998. .
 Brownlow, Kevin. The Parade's Gone By... Berkeley, California: University of California Press, 1968 .
 Farmer, James H. Celluloid Wings: The Impact of Movies on Aviation (1st ed.). Blue Ridge Summit, Pennsylvania: TAB Books 1984. .
 Pickford, Mary. Sunshine and Shadow. New York: Doubleday, 1955. .
 Tarbox, Charles H. Lost Films, 1895-1917. Los Angeles, California: Film Classic Exchange, 1983. .
 Wynne, H. Hugh. The Motion Picture Stunt Pilots and Hollywood's Classic Aviation Movies. Missoula, Montana: Pictorial Histories Publishing Co., 1987. .

External links

A Girl of Yesterday at SilentEra
 
 surviving production stills: #1, ..#2

1915 films
1915 comedy films
Silent American comedy films
American silent feature films
American aviation films
American black-and-white films
Famous Players-Lasky films
Films directed by Allan Dwan
Films shot in Los Angeles
Lost American films
Paramount Pictures
1915 lost films
Lost comedy films
1910s American films